Mohammed Abdul Hussein, (born 1965) is an Iraqi former footballer who played as a forward. He won the title of best player in Iraqi Premier League in 1992–93 season. He was the first footballer from Basra turn professional outside Iraq, He is currently working as coach of the youth team Al-Mina'a.

Honors

As a player

Clubs
Al-Zawra'a
 1994 Iraqi Premier League: Champion
 1994 Iraq FA Cup: Champion

As a manager

Club
Al-Minaa U19
 2017 Paris World Games, Football U19: Champion

Individual
 1988 Tahrir Al-Faw Championship joint top-scorer (5 goals).
 1992–93 Iraqi National League The best player title.

References

External links
A stars of Iraqi football
Al-Minaa Club: Sailors of south

1965 births
Living people
Association football forwards
Iraqi footballers
Sportspeople from Basra
Iraqi expatriate footballers
Expatriate footballers in Lebanon
Al-Mina'a SC players
Al-Zawraa SC players
Iraqi football managers
Expatriate football managers in Lebanon
Iraqi expatriate sportspeople in Lebanon
Racing Club Beirut players
Sagesse SC footballers